The United States District Court for the Western District of North Carolina (in case citations, W.D.N.C.)  is a federal district court which covers the western third of North Carolina.

Appeals from the Western District of North Carolina are taken to the United States Court of Appeals for the Fourth Circuit (except for patent claims and claims against the U.S. government under the Tucker Act, which are appealed to the Federal Circuit).

Jurisdiction 
The court's jurisdiction comprises the following counties: Alexander, Alleghany, Anson, Ashe, Avery, Buncombe, Burke, Caldwell, Catawba, Cherokee, Clay, Cleveland, Gaston, Graham, Haywood, Henderson, Iredell, Jackson, Lincoln, Macon, Madison, McDowell, Mecklenburg, Mitchell, Polk, Rutherford, Swain, Transylvania, Union, Watauga, Wilkes and Yancey. It has jurisdiction over the cities of Asheville, Charlotte, Hickory, and Statesville.

The United States Attorney's Office for the Western District of North Carolina represents the United States in civil and criminal litigation in the court.  the United States Attorney is Dena J. King.

History 

In both instances, these districts, unlike those with geographic designations that existed in other states, were titled by the names of the cities in which the courts sat. After the first division, they were styled the District of Edenton, the District of New Bern, and the District of Wilmington; after the second division, they were styled the District of Albemarle, the District of Cape Fear, and the District of Pamptico. However, in both instances, only one judge was authorized to serve all three districts, causing them to effectively operate as a single district. The latter combination was occasionally referred to by the cumbersome title of the United States District Court for the Albemarle, Cape Fear & Pamptico Districts of North Carolina.

The presiding judge of the District of North Carolina, George Washington Brooks, was then reassigned to preside over only the Eastern District, allowing President Ulysses S. Grant to appoint Robert P. Dick to be the first judge of the Western District of North Carolina.

Current judges 
:

Vacancies and pending nominations

Former judges

Chief judges

Succession of seats

U.S. Attorneys for the Western District 
The Western and Eastern districts were created in 1872. D. H. Starbuck, who was serving as U.S. Attorney for the entire state, continued in office by serving as Attorney for the Western District.
D. H. Starbuck (1870–1876)
Virgil S. Lusk (1876–1880)
James E. Boyd (1880–1885)
Hamilton C. Jones Jr. (1885–1889)
Charles Price (1889–1893)
Robert B. Glenn (1893–1897)
Alfred E. Holton (1897–1914)
William C. Hammer (1914–1920)
Stonewall J. Durham (1920–1921)
Frank A. Linney (1921–1927)
Thomas J. Harkins (1927–1931)
Charles A. Jonas (1931–1932)
Frank Caldwell Patton (1932–1933)
Marcus Erwin (1933–1939)
W. Roy Francis (1939–1940)
Theron L. Candle (1940–1945)
David E. Henderson (1945–1948)
Thomas E. Uzzell (1948–1953)
James M. Baley Jr. (1953–1961)
Hugh E. Monteith (1961)
William Medford (1961–1969)
James O. Israel Jr. (1969)
Keith S. Snyder (1969–1977)
Harold M. Edwards (1977–1981)
Harold J. Bender (1981)
Charles R. Brewer (1981–1987)
Thomas J. Ashcraft (1987–1993)
Jerry W. Miller (1993)
Mark T. Calloway (1994–2001)
Robert J. Conrad Jr. (2001–2004)
Gretchen Shappert (2004–2009)
Edward R. Ryan (acting; 2009–2010)
Anne Tompkins (2010–2015)
Jill Westmoreland Rose (2015–2017)
R. Andrew Murray (2017–2021)
Dena J. King (2021-present)

See also 
 Courts of North Carolina
 List of current United States district judges
 List of United States federal courthouses in North Carolina

References

External links 
 United States District Court for the Western District of North Carolina Official Website

North Carolina, Western District
North Carolina law
Asheville, North Carolina
Charlotte, North Carolina
Hickory, North Carolina
1872 establishments in North Carolina
Courthouses in North Carolina
Western North Carolina
Courts and tribunals established in 1872